Romare Bearden Revealed is a jazz album by the Branford Marsalis Quartet, featuring Branford Marsalis, Eric Revis, Jeff "Tain" Watts, and Joey Calderazzo, with guest appearances by Harry Connick Jr., Wynton Marsalis, Doug Wamble, Reginald Veal, and other members of the Marsalis family. The album, which was recorded June 23–25, 2003 at Clinton Studios in New York, New York, was recorded in celebration of a retrospective exhibit of the art of Romare Bearden which opened at the National Gallery of Art in Washington DC and subsequently traveled to San Francisco, Dallas, New York and Atlanta in 2004 and 2005. The album recorded jazz tunes whose names Bearden had used for paintings as well as original compositions.

Reception

The album peaked at number 19 on the Billboard Top Jazz Albums chart.

Writing for AllMusic.com, Matt Collar called the album an "earthy and accessible homage" to Bearden, noting strong performances by Wynton Marsalis, Harry Connick, Jr., and Doug Wamble.

Ben Ratliff in the New York Times says the album "reflects the nexus of country and city" and calls the performance by Marsalis's quartet "reliably hot." JazzTimes called Marsalis's playing "better than ever" and noted the "joyous, emphatic quality" of the performances.

Track listing

Personnel
 Branford Marsalis – Saxophones
 Eric Revis, bass
 Jeff "Tain" Watts, drums
 Joey Calderazzo, piano

Guests
 Harry Connick, Jr. - piano
 Delfeayo Marsalis - trombone
 Ellis Marsalis, Jr. - piano
 Jason Marsalis - drums
 Wynton Marsalis - trumpet
 Reginald Veal - bass
 Doug Wamble - guitar

References

External links
BranfordMarsalis.com

2003 albums
Branford Marsalis albums